Michael Higgins (September 29, 1908 in London – February 13, 1999 in Riverside, Illinois) was an American glass artist.

Life
He was a King's Scholar at Eton College, and studied at Cambridge University, and the London Central School of Arts and Crafts. Emigrating to the US in 1939, he worked as a Lend-Lease programmer for India during World War II.  Following the war, he became Head of Visual Design at the Chicago Institute of Design, where one of his students was  Frances Stewart. He married Frances in 1948, and together they founded the Higgins Glass studio.

His work is in the Renwick Gallery.
His papers are at the Archives of American Art.

References

External links

http://www.higginsglass.com/
http://www.liveauctioneers.com/item/7233041

1908 births
1999 deaths
People educated at Eton College
Artists from London
American glass artists
British emigrants to the United States